Akashadoothu is 2011 Malayalam language Television drama  produced by M.Renjith aired on Surya TV. It is a sequel to 1993 Indian Malayalam-language drama film Akashadoothu  directed by Sibi Malayil.The film tells the tale of a widow suffering from leukemia, the series takes off exactly 16 years after we saw the children going their separate ways after the funeral of their mother.

Malayalam actress Chippy plays the lead role of Meenu along with Veteran actors K.P.A.C. Lalitha, Sukumari, Vanitha Krishnachandran, Seema G. Nair, Prem Prakash, Jose Prakash plays the supporting roles.

Plot
After the demise of Annie (Madhavi), the four children parts away and after sixteen years Meenu ( eldest daughter played by Chippy) tries to reunite with her younger brothers Tony, Rony and Monu. However things take an unexpected turn when they reunite.

Cast
Chippy Renjith  as Meenu Nandagopan
Shiju as Adv.Nandagopan
Prem Prakash as Aanjilimuttam Joy
Seema G. Nair as Jessy
Vineeth as Monu a.k.a. Kevin David
Anand VR as Tony
_ as Rony
Sonia as Mollykutty Philip
Saju Attingal as Philip
Rajesh Hebbar as Dr.David
Manju Satheesh as Mini
K.P.A.C. Lalitha as Clara Kunjamma
 Sukumari as Brigathamma
J. Pallassery as Nandagopan's father
Meera Krishna as Krishna
Kezia Joseph
Santhosh Kurup
Vanitha Krishnachandran as Marykunju
Rahul Mohan as Alex
Varsha as Shirley
Yathikumar as Xavier
Kottayam Rasheed as Pulikattil Mathachan
Murugan as Madhavan
Jose Prakash as Father (Cameo Appearance)
Aaranmulla Ponnamma as Anjilimoottil Annaamma
Anil Murali
Adithyan Jayan
Priyanka Nair
Sharika Menon as Nirmala
Geetha Nair as Krishna's mother
Raghavan as Krishna's father
Ambika Mohan 
Vishnu Prakash as Nandagopan's brother
Devu Krishnan
Manoj as CI Cleetus
Subhash Menon
Ashraf Pezhumoodu
Rajeev Pala
Seema
Archana Menon
Prakash
Rugmini
Sreekutty
Anjana Appukuttan
Srilakshmi
Krishna Prabha

Appearance from the movie
Madhavi  as Annie
Murali  as Johnny 
Seena Antony as Meenu
Ben K Alexander as Monu
Martin as Roni
Joseph Antony as Tony
Nedumudi Venu as Fr.Vattapara
Subair as Dr. David
Bindu Panicker as Marykunju
Suvarna Mathew as Mini

References

External links
 

Surya TV original programming
Malayalam-language television shows